Charlie Lynch (1891-1968) was a multi-premiership-winning Australian rugby league coach of the 1920s and 1940s.

South Sydney
Lynch is mainly remembered as a premiership winning coach of the South Sydney club. A prodigy of the great Arthur Hennessey, Lynch took over from Alf Blair as the first grade coach in 1928, and coached to the club for 11 seasons between 1928-1934 and 1937-1940. He won a premiership in his debut year as a first grade coach in 1928, and also tasted premiership success in 1929, 1931 and 1932. After many years at the helm of South Sydney, he retired from coaching at the conclusion of the 1940 season.

St. George
As a resident of Carlton, New South Wales, he began an association with St. George, and stepped in as their first grade coach in 1947 replacing Herb Narvo from the previous year. Although Lynch was popular with players and members, the St. George club missed the finals in 1947, and Charlie Lynch was not retained by the club as coach for the 1948 season.

Accolades
Lynch was awarded Life Membership of the South Sydney Rabbitohs in 1967, and he died the following year.

References

1891 births
1968 deaths
South Sydney Rabbitohs coaches
St. George Dragons coaches